Isharheri is a village in Hansi-I mandal of the Hisar district, in the Indian state of Haryana.

References

Villages in Hisar district